The Young European Research Universities Network (YERUN) is a non-profit association that brings together young research-oriented universities in Europe. YERUN represents 22 universities from 15 European countries. The network aims at strategic collaboration among young European universities to shape future education policies. Furthermore, the initiative seeks to increase mobility for students, researchers and administrative staff among its member institutions.

History
YERUN was launched in Dublin on April 30, 2015.

Organization
The network is run by the assembly of rectors, vice-chancellors or respective presidents of its member universities. The assembly elects an executive board that includes a president and a secretary. The current president is Snježana Prijić-Samaržija (University of Rijeka).

YERUN member institutions

References

External links
 Official website

College and university associations and consortia in Europe